Federico Zani (born 9 April 1989) is an Italian rugby union player. His usual position is as a prop, and he has been playing in the United Rugby Championship for Benetton since 2016.

Under contract with Mogliano, in 2015–16 Pro12 season, he named as Additional Player for Benetton Treviso in Pro 12.

In 2015 and 2016 Zani was named in the Emerging Italy squad from 2017 he was also named in the Italy squad. 
On 18 August 2019, he was named in the final 31-man squad for the 2019 Rugby World Cup. On 8 November 2021 he was named in the Italy A squad for the 2021 end-of-year rugby union internationals. In March 2022 it was announced that his contract was extended until the end of 2024.

References

External links

1989 births
Living people
Sportspeople from Parma
Italian rugby union players
Italy international rugby union players
Rugby union props
Rugby Colorno players
Petrarca Rugby players
Mogliano Rugby players
Benetton Rugby players